Love on Toast is a 1937 American comedy film directed by Ewald André Dupont. It was John Payne's fourth film.

Cast
Stella Adler as Linda Craven
John Payne as Bill Adams
Grant Richards as Clark Sanford
Kathryn Kane as Polly Marr
Benny Baker as Egbert
Isabell Jewell as Belle Huntley
Luis Alberni as Joe Piso

External links

1937 comedy films
American comedy films
American black-and-white films
Paramount Pictures films
Films directed by E. A. Dupont
1930s American films